Three Saints Bay (r Bukhta Tryokh Svyatitelyej) is a 9 Mile (14 Kilometer)-long inlet on the southeast side of Kodiak Island, Alaska, north of Sitkalidak Strait. The Three Saints Bay Site is an archaeological site, the location of the first Russian settlement in Alaska, Three Saints Harbor (Gavan’ Tryokh Svyatitelyej). The settlement was founded in 1784 by Grigory Shelikhov. The main settlement was moved in 1792 to Pavlovskaya Gavan (Павловская гавань – Paul's Harbor), now known as the city of Kodiak. The Three Saints Bay Site was declared a National Historic Landmark by the United States in 1978.

History 

Although Russian fur hunters had established temporary shore stations in Alaska earlier, they intended the  Three Saints site to be a permanent colonial settlement.  The site was poorly chosen, for the hillside above the shore area was too steep to build on, and the shore area was too small for a substantial settlement.  When it was visited in 1790, it was described as a cluster of small structures (probably barabaras), with a population of about fifty men and a small number of women.  The site was harmed by subsidence and a probable tsunami in the wake of a 1788 earthquake. In 1791, Alexander Baranov began moving the main Russian settlement to the site of present-day Kodiak.

Only a few remnants of the Russian occupation remain on the surface.  These are mainly pits and rectangular depressions, indications of where structures were located, and some plants that are evidence of the small-scale agriculture which was practiced there. The settlement's cemetery was located to its southeast. Excavation at the site yielded evidence that it was built on the site of an older native settlement, dating to c. 100 BCE.

The Russian settlement site was listed on the United States National Register of Historic Places in 1972, and was designated a National Historic Landmark in 1978.

Etymology 
The bay was named for the harbor, in turn named after one of Shelikhov's ships. It was named for the Three Holy Hierarchs. It was reported by Petroff in the 10th Census in 1880.

The same area was later called Lyakhik Bay (Zaliv Lyakhik) by Captain Tebenkov. This was based on its Aleut name Liakik, probably from liak ("black-footed goose").

See also
 Awa'uq Massacre
 Maritime Fur Trade
 List of National Historic Landmarks in Alaska
 National Register of Historic Places listings in Kodiak Island Borough, Alaska

References

Bays of Alaska
Ghost towns in Alaska
Bodies of water of Kodiak Island Borough, Alaska
National Historic Landmarks in Alaska
Archaeological sites on the National Register of Historic Places in Alaska
Populated places in Russian America
Populated places established in 1784
National Register of Historic Places in Kodiak Island Borough, Alaska
Populated places on the National Register of Historic Places in Alaska
Ghost towns in the United States
Ghost towns in North America
Towns in the United States